, is one of the original 40 throws of Judo as developed by Jigoro Kano. It belongs to the second group, Dai Nikyo, of the traditional throwing list, Gokyo (no waza), of Kodokan Judo. It is also part of the current 67 Throws of Kodokan Judo. It is classified as a hip throwing technique, Koshi-Waza. Tsurikomi Goshi is also one of the 20 techniques in Danzan Ryu's Nage No Te list.

Technique description 
Graphic
from http://www.judoinfo.com/techdraw.htm

Judo:

Danzan Ryu:

Exemplar Videos:

Demonstrated
from
http://www.judoinfo.com/gokyo1.htm

Tournament
from
http://judoinfo.com/video8.htm

Technique history

Included systems 
Systems:
Kodokan Judo, Judo Lists
Danzan Ryu, Danzan Ryu Lists
Lists:
The Canon Of Judo
Judo technique

Similar techniques, variants, and aliases 
English aliases:
Sleeve tip throw
Lifting and pulling hip throw

External links
 Tsurikomi Goshi — Lifting Pulling Hip – Judo Info

References 
 Ohlenkamp, Neil (2006) Judo Unleashed basic reference on judo. .

Judo technique
Throw (grappling)